The New Jersey Music Hall of Fame was founded in 2005 in Asbury Park, New Jersey, with plans to construct a building in downtown Asbury Park or closer to the Boardwalk. New Jersey has a rich musical heritage, covering artists from Count Basie to Frank Sinatra to Bruce Springsteen. New Jersey has also played a role in the technology behind music; Thomas Edison invented the record player in the state in 1877, while Les Paul created the solid-body guitar.

See also 
 List of music museums

References

Halls of fame in New Jersey
Music halls of fame
State halls of fame in the United States
Proposed museums in the United States
Music museums in the United States
Biographical museums in New Jersey
Asbury Park, New Jersey